To the Faithful Departed is the third studio album by Irish alternative rock band the Cranberries, released on 30 April 1996. The album was made in memory of Denny Cordell who signed the band to Island Records and Joe O'Riordan (vocalist Dolores O'Riordan's grandfather), who had both died that year. The album reached number one in four countries and became the band's highest-charting album on the US Billboard 200, where it peaked at number four.

Packaging

The album sleeve photo session was made up of two parts, the first being the original design for the front cover, a naked baby boy (supplied by their press officer Smash at Island Records) lying on his back, which was shot in photographer Andy Earl's new studio on Shad Thames in London, and the band seated in a yellow room. At the last minute, at Dolores O'Riordan's request, the two were swapped and the yellow room became the front cover.

The yellow room was designed to be an echo of the previous two album sleeves. It was built in London and transported to the Lake District and erected in a forest near Loughrigg Holme. Snow fell on the day of the photoshoot, and the band spent as little time as possible on the shoot clad, as they were wearing new purple Dolce & Gabbana outfits.

A new logo and typeface were decided upon signifying the band's desire to move on from the strict repetition of the previous album sleeves. Incidental studio photos were included, taken by Cally in the band's studio in Vancouver, Canada. Cally added: "I attended the surreal Brit Awards where Jarvis Cocker invaded Michael Jackson's stage and left soon after to drive through horizontal snow to get to the Lake District in readiness for the photo shoot the next day. On waking in the Ambleside Hotel I saw Jarvis on the front cover of every paper, being released from jail with Nigel, The Cranberries A&R man beside him. Things only became more surreal when we realised that later we were shooting the band bravely clad in thin purple suits under snowfall in a yellow room in a forest in the Lake District".

Television performances
To promote To the Faithful Departed, the Cranberries appeared on different television shows (1995–1996).

Free to Decide World Tour

In 1996, the Cranberries toured in Asia, Oceania and North America to promote their third studio album To the Faithful Departed. The band embarked on a 117-date world tour which began on 30 April 1996 in Philippines but was stopped on 8 June 1996 in Cairns during the Australian leg, due to a knee injury of O'Riordan. The remaining dates of the Australian tour were canceled and O'Riordan returned to Ireland for surgery. The tour resumed on 1 August 1996 in North America but was stopped after twenty-eight concerts because of poor physical and mental health of O'Riordan. The Cranberries complained that they never had a rest since the beginning of their career and invoked saturation. O'Riordan was pressured by managers not to stop the tour because of a cost between $8 million to $14 million. Despite this, the remaining dates of the North American tour and the European leg of the Free to Decide World Tour were canceled.

Dates

Track listing

Original release

1996 US version

Personnel

The Cranberries
Dolores O'Riordan – vocals, electric guitar, acoustic guitar, keyboards, whistle, mandolin
Noel Hogan – electric guitar, acoustic guitar, mandolin
Mike Hogan – bass guitar
Fergal Lawler – drums, percussion

Additional musicians
Michael Kamen – orchestration
Henry Daag – saw ("Bosnia")
Richie Buckley – tenor saxophone ("Salvation")
Michael Buckley – baritone saxophone ("Salvation")
Bruce Fairbairn – trumpet ("Salvation")
Randy Raine-Reusch – additional percussion

Producing and technical staff
Bruce Fairbairn – producer
The Cranberries – producer
Mike Plontikoff – engineering, mixing
Andy Earl – photographer
Adrian Myers – assistant photographer
Baron Kallstein – incidental photographs (aka Cally: art director)

Charts

Weekly charts

Year-end charts

Certifications

References

External links
 Cranberries official discography

1996 albums
The Cranberries albums
Island Records albums
Albums produced by Bruce Fairbairn
Albums recorded at Armoury Studios